Whites Hill is a  mountain in the northern Adirondack Mountains of New York. It is located southeast of Parishville in St. Lawrence County. The mountain is the former site of an  steel fire lookout tower that was in service from 1951 to 1971.

History
In 1950, the Conservation Department built an  Aermotor LS40 steel fire lookout tower on the mountain. The tower began fire lookout operations in 1951, reporting 3 fires and 588 visitors. Due to increased use of aerial detection, the tower ceased fire lookout operations at the end of the 1971 fire lookout season and was later removed. The cabin was later moved to the New York State Department of Environmental Conservation's Trout Lake Shop where it is used by Operations Unit personnel.

References

Mountains of St. Lawrence County, New York
Mountains of New York (state)